Charles Henry Beeson (1870–1949) was an American classical scholar. His book  A Primer of Medieval Latin: An Anthology of Prose and Poetry (1925) has remained one of the leading texts for learning post-classical Latin. In addition, he was an active researcher and reviewer, especially for the journal Classical Philology. In 1935, he was elected a Fellow of the American Academy of Arts and Sciences.

Beeson was born in Columbia City, Indiana. In 1893, he received his A.B. in classics from Indiana University. In 1895, he received his A.M. from Indiana. In 1907, he received his Ph.D. from Munich University. While at Indiana University he assisted Carl H. Eigenmann in studies of the fishes of Indiana, and elsewhere, and was the coauthor of a few ichthyological papers, including the Fishes of Indiana, Preliminary note on the relationship of the species usually united under the generic name Sebastodes  and  Pteropodus dallii sp. nov.

During World War I, he worked in the Military Intelligence Division (MID) Cryptography Department (MI-8).

Publications

Books
A Primer of Medieval Latin: An Anthology of Prose and Poetry, Chicago, 1925.

Articles
The Vocabulary of the Annales Fuldenses, Speculum Vol. 1 (1), Jan. 1926: 31-37 
Isidore's Institutionum Disciplinae and Pliny the Younger, Classical Philology Vol. 8 (1), Jan. 1913: 93-98
The Text Tradition of Donatus' Commentary on Terence, Classical Philology  Vol. 17 (4), Oct. 1922: 283-305 
The Archetype of the Roman Agrimensores, Classical Philology  Vol. 23 (1), Jan. 1928: 1-14 
The Manuscript Problem of Vitruvius, Classical Philology Vol. 30 (4) Oct. 1935: 342-347 
The Text History of the Corpus Caesarianum, Classical Philology Vol. 35 (2), Apr. 1940: 113-125 
The Collectaneum of Hadoard, Classical Philology Vol. 40 (4), Oct. 1945: 201-222 
The Manuscripts of Bede, Classical Philology Vol. 42 (2), Apr. 1947: 73-87 
Lupus of Ferrières and Hadoard, Classical Philology Vol. 43 (3) Jul. 1948: 190-191

References

External links

1870 births
1949 deaths
American classical scholars
American military personnel of World War I
Fellows of the American Academy of Arts and Sciences
Indiana University Bloomington alumni
People from Columbia City, Indiana
Classical philologists
Fellows of the Medieval Academy of America
Linguists from the United States